Wendy Holden may refer to:
 Wendy Holden (author, born 1965), English historical novelist and journalist
 Wendy Holden (author, born 1961), English novelist